Micrabaciidae is a family of marine stony corals of the order Scleractinia.

The World Register of Marine Species lists the following genera:
 Leptopenus Moseley, 1881
 Letepsammia Yabe & Eguchi, 1932
 Micrabacia† Milne Edwards & Haime, 1849
 Rhombopsammia Owens, 1986
 Stephanophyllia Michelin, 1841

References

 
Scleractinia
Cnidarian families